Jacob Steven Petricka (born June 5, 1988) is an American professional baseball pitcher who is currently a free agent. He has played in Major League Baseball (MLB) for the Chicago White Sox, Toronto Blue Jays, Milwaukee Brewers, and Los Angeles Angels.

Career

Chicago White Sox
Petricka played college baseball at Iowa Western Community College from 2006 to 2008 and Indiana State University before he was drafted by the Chicago White Sox in the 2nd round of the 2010 MLB draft. He started his career in 2010 with the Rookie Level Bristol White Sox and Class A Kannapolis Intimidators. He finished the 2010 season with a combined record of 2–5 in 17 games (8 starts),  innings, 3.05 ERA, 38 hits, 15 walks and 48 strikeouts. In 2011, Petricka split time between Bristol, Kannapolis and Class A-Advanced Winston-Salem Dash. He finished the 2011 season with a combined record of 7–8 in 23 games (22 starts),  innings, 3.65 ERA, 114 hits, 39 walks and 99 strikeouts.

Petricka suffered a back injury that forced him to miss time during the 2011 and struggle in 2012. In 2012, he started the season with Winston-Salem but was later promoted to Double-A Birmingham Barons. He finished the 2012 season with a combined record of 8–8 in 29 games (29 starts),  innings, 5.39 ERA, 156 hits, 81 walks and 111 strikeouts. Before the start of the 2013 season, he was ranked the White Sox #20 prospect.

Petricka is no longer a starter, having been moved to the bullpen for the 2013 season. He started the season at Birmingham pitching 21 games (1 start) with a record of 3–0. In  innings of work at Birmingham, Petricka had a 2.06 ERA, 36 hits, 18 walks and 41 strikeouts. He was then promoted to the Triple-A Charlotte Knights.

The White Sox promoted Petricka on August 17, 2013. On August 22, he made his Major League debut against the Kansas City Royals. He pitched two-thirds of an inning and earned his first career Major League victory during the 4–3 Sox win in 12 innings. He finished the 2013 season with a 3.26 ERA in 16 games. From 2014 to 2015, Petricka was a major asset for the White Sox' bullpen, posting an ERA of 2.96 and 3.62 respectively in each year. He also recorded 14 saves in 2014. On July 6, 2016, he was moved to the 60-day disabled list.

Toronto Blue Jays
On February 8, 2018, Petricka signed a minor league contract with the Toronto Blue Jays that included an invitation to spring training. He was added to the 40-man roster and activated on May 4. He was optioned to the Triple-A Buffalo Bisons the next day, and recalled again on May 8 when Roberto Osuna was placed on administrative leave. Petricka split time between the Blue Jays bullpen and the Bisons, logging  innings for the Blue Jays in 41 appearances. On November 2, 2018, he cleared waivers and entered free agency.

Milwaukee Brewers
On January 12, 2019, Petricka signed with the Milwaukee Brewers. He was designated for assignment on April 27, 2019, and outrighted on May 1.

Texas Rangers
Petricka was traded to the Texas Rangers for cash considerations or a player to be named later on June 14, 2019, and was assigned to the Triple-A Nashville Sounds. He became a free agent following the 2019 season.

Second stint with the Blue Jays
On February 7, 2020, Petricka signed a minor league contract with the Toronto Blue Jays. He was released on September 9, 2020.

High Point Rockers
On March 16, 2021, Petricka signed with the High Point Rockers of the Atlantic League of Professional Baseball. He recorded one scoreless inning in his only appearance for High Point.

Los Angeles Angels
On June 1, 2021, Petricka's contract was purchased by the Los Angeles Angels organization. He was then assigned to the Triple-A Salt Lake Bees. After appearing in 19 games for Salt Lake, posting a 3.69 ERA with 32 strikeouts, Petricka's contract was selected by the Angels on August 25. Petricka was designated for assignment by the Angels on September 16 and released by the team on September 21.

Minnesota Twins
On March 31, 2022, Petricka signed a minor league contract with the Minnesota Twins. He was released on July 29, 2022.

References

External links

1988 births
Living people
American expatriate baseball players in Canada
Baseball players from Minnesota
Birmingham Barons players
Bristol White Sox players
Buffalo Bisons (minor league) players
Charlotte Knights players
Chicago White Sox players
High Point Rockers players
Indiana State Sycamores baseball players
Iowa Western Reivers baseball players
Kannapolis Intimidators players
Los Angeles Angels players
Major League Baseball pitchers
Mesa Solar Sox players
Milwaukee Brewers players
Nashville Sounds players
People from Northfield, Minnesota
Salt Lake Bees players
San Antonio Missions players
Toronto Blue Jays players
Winston-Salem Dash players
Mankato MoonDogs players